Hayden Norman Thorpe (born 18 January 1986) is an English singer, songwriter and multi-instrumentalist, originally from Kendal, Cumbria and currently based in Walthamstow, London.

Career
From 2002 to 2018, Thorpe was the frontman of the indie pop band Wild Beasts, which he initially co-founded as a duo with guitarist Ben Little. Eventually expanding into a four-piece, the band released five studio albums on Domino Records to much critical acclaim, yet only modest commercial success. Following the band's dissolution, Thorpe pursued a solo career, and released his debut album Diviner through Domino in May 2019.

In July 2021, Thorpe announced his second album, Moondust for My Diamond to be released 15 October 2021 via Domino Records, the announcement came with a video for the song "The Universe Is Always Right".

Musical style and influences

Thorpe is often noted for his distinct, operatic countertenor vocal style, which critics commonly described as being both unusual and an acquired taste in the field of indie rock. Thorpe has cited Leonard Cohen, Kate Bush and The Smiths as amongst his musical influences, as well as writer Arthur Rimbaud on his lyrics.

Discography

Albums 

 Diviner (2019)
 Moondust for My Diamond (2021)

EPs 

 Aerial Songs (2020)

References 

1986 births
21st-century English singers
English male singers
English bass guitarists
English male guitarists
Male bass guitarists
English people of Australian descent
Rhythm guitarists
Countertenors
Domino Recording Company artists
Living people
People from Kendal
21st-century British male singers
People from Walthamstow